The 2015–16 season was the 92nd season in the existence of AEK Athens F.C. and the 55th season in the top flight of Greek football. They competed in the Super League and the Greek Cup. The season began on 22 August 2015 and finished on 31 May 2016.

Overview
AEK Athens finally returned in Super League after 2 years of absence. The team experienced radical changes over the summer. The major signings were André Simões from Moreirense, Rodrigo Galo, Venezuela internationals, Ronald Vargas and Alain Baroja as a loan from Caracas, Dídac Vilà from Milan and Diego Buonanotte who hundreds of AEK fans greeted at the airport. The transfers also included the return of Rafik Djebbour after 4 years. On 20 October 2015, after a heavy defeat from Olympicos, Traianos Dellas resigned as coach after 2 and a half years and 21 October 2015 Stelios Manolas, AEK Athens' under-20 coach, took over as an interim until a new coach was found. On 29 October 2015, Gus Poyet reached an agreement with the club and on 30 October signed a contract until the summer of 2016 with renewal option for two years, a discussion that would take place towards the end of the period. Poyet managed to change the atmosphere in the club and lead the club to an unbeaten streak spanning from the start of 2016 to February 2016. The team picked up 3 important derby wins against PAOK, Panathinaikos and Olympiacos at home all by 1–0 win with the same scorer, Ronald Vargas. On 19 April 2016 Poyet was sacked due to conflicts with club president Dimitris Melissanidis, mainly focusing the club's ambitions and budget. Stelios Manolas was appointed as interim head coach and managed AEK until the end of the season, qualifying for the Cup final against Olympiacos. AEK managed to beat Olympiacos by 2–1 for the second time within 3 months and lifted the 15th Cup Title in their history. The same night, celebrations were organised by fans at Nea Filadelfeia who celebrated with the players and staff. At the league play–offs the team did not capitalise on their form in the Greek Cup and facing the fatigue that was built up, only managed a 3rd-place finish, thus qualifying for the 2016-17 UEFA Europa League in the 3rd qualifying round.

Events
 30 January 2015 Before the campaign was over, André Simões agreed to a two-year contract with AEK Athens which was made effective on 1 July.
 13 May 2015 Rodrigo Galo signed a two-year contract with AEK Athens.
 10 June 2015 AEK Athens gets promoted to the Super League.
 11 June 2015 Stavros Vasilantonopoulos  joins AEK Athens from Apollon Smyrnis for 2+1 years.
 17 June 2015 Rafik Djebbour  joins AEK Athens from APOEL for 1+1 year.
 16 July 2015 Alain Baroja joins AEK Athens from Caracas on a 1-year loan.
 7 August 2015 Dídac Vilà joins AEK Athens for 2+1 years.
 20 October 2015 Traianos Dellas quits as AEK Athens coach after  years.
21 October 2015 Stelios Manolas AEK Athens' under-20 coach will take up the post on an interim basis until a new coach is found.
29 October 2015 Gus Poyet reached an agreement with AEK Athens.
30 October 2015 Gus Poyet sign contract with AEK Athens The agreement is until the summer of 2016 with a two-year renewal option, a discussion that will take place towards the end of the period.

Players

Squad information

NOTE: The players are the ones that have been announced by the AEK Athens' press release. No edits should be made unless a player arrival or exit is announced. Updated 30 June 2016, 23:59 UTC+3.

Transfers

In

Summer

Winter

Out

Summer

Winter

Loan in

Summer

Winter

Loan out

Summer

Winter

Renewals

Overall transfer activity

Spending
Summer:  €160,000

Winter:  €0

Total:  €160,000

Income
Summer:  €0

Winter:  €0

Total:  €0

Expenditure
Summer:  €160,000

Winter:  €0

Total:  €160,000

Pre-season and friendlies

Super League

Regular season

League table

Results summary

Results by Matchday

Fixtures

Play-offs

Τable

Results by Matchday

Fixtures

Greek Cup

Group G

Matches

Group stage

Round of 16

Quarter-finals

Semi-finals

Final

Statistics

Squad statistics

! colspan="11" style="background:#FFDE00; text-align:center" | Goalkeepers
|-

! colspan="11" style="background:#FFDE00; color:black; text-align:center;"| Defenders
|-

! colspan="11" style="background:#FFDE00; color:black; text-align:center;"| Midfielders
|-

! colspan="11" style="background:#FFDE00; color:black; text-align:center;"| Forwards
|-

! colspan="11" style="background:#FFDE00; color:black; text-align:center;"| Left during Winter Transfer Window
|-

|-
|}

Disciplinary record

|-
! colspan="17" style="background:#FFDE00; text-align:center" | Goalkeepers

|-
! colspan="17" style="background:#FFDE00; color:black; text-align:center;"| Defenders

|-
! colspan="17" style="background:#FFDE00; color:black; text-align:center;"| Midfielders

|-
! colspan="17" style="background:#FFDE00; color:black; text-align:center;"| Forwards

|-
! colspan="17" style="background:#FFDE00; color:black; text-align:center;"| Left during Winter Transfer window

|-
|}

Starting 11

Management

 Giannhs Stathas

Goalscorers

Team kit 

|
|
|
|
|
|
|

References

External links
AEK Athens F.C. Official Website

AEK Athens F.C. seasons
AEK Athens